The Voisin V was a French pusher-type bomber aircraft of World War I.

Development history
The Voisin III had proved a successful bomber, but its payload was limited by the Salmson M9 engine, which produced only 120-hp. With an already identified need to develop a heavier and more powerful aircraft to deliver a larger bomb-load, an interim measure was taken to produce a Voisin Type III with a 150-hp Salmson P9 engine.
 
At the same time, the airframe was strengthened and the central nacelle streamlined. The new engine was placed on a raised platform to provide clearance for the propeller and was angled to provide downward thrust. In addition, the landing gear was strengthened and the wing chord was increased from the roots to the wing tips.

The new aircraft was given the STAé designation Voisin Type V, while the factory designation was Voisin LAS. The S stood for surélevé (raised) which indicated the raised engine mount. The previous Type III variant had an exhaust system which permitted fumes to escape freely; the Type V incorporated a more effective system of twin exhaust pipes.

One Voisin Type V was transformed into a twin-engine aircraft in 1916 by adding a second Salmson in the front of the fuselage driving a tractor propeller. It is believed that the intention was to test a possible twin pusher and tractor propeller configuration for a new bomber planned by Voisin. The twin-engine Voisin Type 5 first flew in early 1916 but appears not to have been developed further.
 
The first Voisin Type V came into operational use in 1915 and not long after replaced the Voisin Type III on the production lines. However, the Voisins 150 hp (as they were referred to at the Western Front) were held in low regard by their crews. Despite the more powerful engine, the Voisin Type Vs' payload was only marginally better and the maximum speed was only 13 km/h faster.

Operational use
Approximately 350 Voisin Type Vs were built, and these served alongside the Voisin Type IIIs in front-line escadrilles during 1915 and well into 1916.

In common with other Voisin variants, the pusher engine  configuration of the Type V resulted in the aircraft being defenceless against attacks from the rear.  However this variant continued the operational use of all of the types both in training and bombing roles.

Operators

Argentine Air Force - one aircraft 

French Air Force

Imperial Russian Air Service

Swiss Air Force - One aircraft only.

Specifications

References

Taylor, J. W. R. (ed) Combat Aircraft of the World. pp. 132–3 London: Michael Joseph, 1969, 

Military aircraft of World War I
1910s French bomber aircraft
Single-engined pusher aircraft
05
Aircraft first flown in 1914
Biplanes